Unterstinkenbrunn is a town in the district of Mistelbach in the Austrian state of Lower Austria.

Population

Trivia 

 Unterstinkenbrunn was the hometown of the violinist Johann Hummel (31 May 1754, Unterstinkenbrunn–20 Dec. 1828, Jena), the father of the composer Johann Nepomuk Hummel.

 Unterstinkenbrunn was mentioned in the song "Lach-Jodler" by Franzl Lang

References

Cities and towns in Mistelbach District